The 2013 San Marino CEPU Open was a professional tennis tournament plays on clay courts. It was the 26th edition of the tournament which is part of the Tretorn SERIE+ of the 2013 ATP Challenger Tour. It takes place in City of San Marino, San Marino between 5 and 11 August 2013.

Singles main draw entrants

Seeds

 1 Rankings are as of July 30, 2013.

Other entrants
The following players received wildcards into the singles main draw:
  Marco Cecchinato
  Alessandro Giannessi
  Gianluigi Quinzi
  Stefano Travaglia

The following players received entry from the qualifying draw:
  Federico Gaio
  Roberto Marcora
  Matteo Trevisan
  Adelchi Virgili

Champions

Singles

  Marco Cecchinato def.  Filippo Volandri 6–3, 6–4

Doubles

  Nicholas Monroe /  Simon Stadler def.  Daniele Bracciali /  Florin Mergea 6–2, 6–4

External links
Official Website
ITF Search
ATP official site

San Marino CEPU Open
San Marino CEPU Open